Akaishi (written: 赤石 lit "red stone") is a Japanese surname. Notable people with the surname include:

, Japanese sport wrestler
, Japanese manga artist

Japanese-language surnames